"Since i Found You" is a song written by Radney Foster and Bill Lloyd, and recorded by American country music duo Sweethearts of the Rodeo.  It was released in July 1986 as the second single from the album Sweethearts of the Rodeo.  The song reached #7 on the Billboard Hot Country Singles & Tracks chart. The song was also featured as the opening and closing theme of the romantic comedy, Nadine, starring Kim Basinger and Jeff Bridges.

Chart performance

References

1986 singles
1986 songs
Sweethearts of the Rodeo songs
Songs written by Radney Foster
Songs written by Bill Lloyd (country musician)
Song recordings produced by Steve Buckingham (record producer)
Columbia Records singles